Thomas Duggan (1882–1930) was a Canadian sports promoter.

Thomas or Tom Duggan may also refer to:

Thomas Hinds Duggan (1815–1865), Texas state senator 
Tom Duggan (1915–1969), American radio commentator
Tommy Duggan (1897–1961), American soccer player

See also
Tom Dugan (disambiguation)